The following is a summary of Donegal county football team's 2021 season.

Personnel changes
Paul Fisher departed as strength and conditioning coach and Antoin McFadden replaced him. Karl Lacey also departed from the management team.

Competitions

Dr McKenna Cup
There was no McKenna Cup in 2021 due to the impact of the COVID-19 pandemic on Gaelic games.

National Football League Division 1

The 2021 competition was delayed due to the COVID-19 pandemic.

Donegal qualified for the semi-finals.

Table

Fixtures

Ulster Senior Football Championship

The draw for the 2021 Ulster Championship was made on 22 April 2021.

Bracket

Fixtures

All-Ireland Senior Football Championship

Due to the impact of the COVID-19 pandemic on Gaelic games, there was no back-door route into the All-Ireland Championship. Therefore, because Donegal did not win the Ulster Championship, they did not qualify for the 2021 All-Ireland Championship.

Management team
Confirmed in November 2017, with replacements noted:
Manager: Declan Bonner
Assistant manager: Paul McGonigle, not listed among November 2017 appointments
Head coach: John McElholm
Coach: Gary Boyle
Selector: Stephen Rochford, replacing Karl Lacey after 2018 season but Lacey actually carried on until the end of 2020
Goalkeeping coach: James Gallagher, after 2020 season replacing Andrew McGovern
Strength and conditioning coach: Antoin McFadden, who after 2020 season, replaced Paul Fisher
Nutritionist: Ronan Doherty
Team physician: Kevin Moran
Physio: Cathal Ellis
Psychology and performance manager: Anthony McGrath, previously involved with the minor team
Video analysis: Chris Byrne
Logistics: Packie McDyre
Kitman: Barry McBride

Awards

All Stars
One nomination, for M. Lanagan.

GAA.ie Football Team of the Week
 17 May: Shaun Patton, Neil McGee, Michael Murphy
 24 May: Michael Langan
 31 May: Ryan McHugh, Patrick McBrearty (McBrearty voted Footballer of the Week)
 28 June: Ryan McHugh, Patrick McBrearty
 12 July: Caolan McGonagle, Niall O'Donnell
 19 July: Eoghan Bán Gallagher

Notes

References

External links
 Matchday programmes released online for games played during the COVID-19 pandemic:
 NFL Division 1 North v Monaghan 
 Ulster semi-final v Tyrone 
 Ulster minor final 

Donegal
Donegal county football team seasons